

Men's tournament
The 2006 Men's Basketball Cup was contested by eight teams and won by Primeiro de Agosto. The final was played on May 9 and 12, 2006.

Preliminary rounds

Knockout round

Women's tournament
The 2006 Women's Basketball Cup was contested by three teams and won by Primeiro de Agosto.

Preliminary round

Semi finals

Final

See also
 2006 Angola Basketball Super Cup
 2006 BAI Basket

References

Angola Basketball Cup seasons
Cup